Jacquelyn Zita is an American born philosopher, active in environmental justice issues and how they impact gender and racial justice considerations.  A former professor at the University of Minnesota, Zita is known for her involvement in the Women's Environmental Institute, which she helped found in 2003, and her role as WEI's farm manager and director of education and operations.

Personal background 
Raised in Missouri, Zita attended William Chrisman high school for her first 3 years of high school.   Truman High school, Independence MO opened in 1964 and Zita  spent her senior year there, graduating in 1965. Zita was a talented tennis player in this pre-Title IX era, so she played on the boys tennis team, lettering for 3 years at William Chrisman High School before playing an undefeated season as the  #1 seed at Truman high School, leading the team to the conference championship.  She graduated from Truman High School in 1965.  She was named to the Truman High School Hall of Fame in 2018.

Education 
Zita attended Washington University, in St. Louis MO.  She received her BA in Biology and Chemistry in 1969, graduating Phi Beta Kappa.  She went on to study Philosophy in graduate school at Washington University,  receiving her Ph. D. in 1982.

Professional 
A Professor of Gender, Women and Sexuality Studies in the College of Liberal Arts at the University of Minnesota, Zita has taught a variety of courses such as "EcoFeminism and Environmental Justice" Zita has also held a number of influential academic positions at the university and at the National Level, including:

 Chair, Department of Women's Studies, University of Minnesota: 1995 - 2001.
 Co-Chair of the National Women's Studies Association Program Administration and Development Committee: 2000 - 2003.
 President of the National Women's Studies Association: 2004 - 2005.

Zita has been recognized for her teaching and mentoring skills with the following awards:

 College of Liberal Arts Teaching Award, University of Minnesota, 1991
 Morse Alumni Teaching Award, University of Minnesota, 1997
 Academy of Distinguished Teachers, 1997
 University of Minnesota Mortar Board Honor Society Award for Outstanding Faculty, 2001
 University of Minnesota Community Service Award, 2006

In 2003, Zita helped found the Women's Environmental Institute, a non-profit organization designed to address environmental injustice issues.  An active member of the WEI, Zita serves as the farm manager and director of education and operations of the institute's Amador Farms.  This 70 acre farm is a community resource for organic farming, designed as a sustainable operation that provides education and food to the community while helping to foster urban agriculture where food injustice issues are so pronounced.

Publications 

 Third Wave Feminisms. Zita, Jacquelyn, Hypatia: A Journal of Feminist Philosophy (special issue), 1997.
 The Reproduciton of Whiteness: Race and the Regulation of the Gendered Body. Zita, Jacquelyn, Alison Bailey, ed., Hypatia: A Journal of Feminist Philosophy, 2007.
 Body Talk: Philosophical Reflections on Sex and Gender. Zita, Jacquelyn, Columbia University Press, Author, 1998

References

Living people
21st-century American philosophers
University of Minnesota faculty
Washington University in St. Louis alumni
Year of birth missing (living people)